Clapperboard is a 1970s children's television programme hosted by Chris Kelly, which covered film and television production. The show was made by Granada Television for the ITV network and ran for 254 episodes. It was produced by Muriel Young and broadcast between April 1972 and January 1982. Young herself fronted the show on occasions when Kelly was unavailable.

References
Clapperboard at the BFI Film and TV Database

External links 
 

1972 British television series debuts
1982 British television series endings
1970s British children's television series
1980s British children's television series
ITV children's television shows
Television series by ITV Studios
Television shows produced by Granada Television
English-language television shows